The 2019–20 season was Newcastle Jets Women's twelfth season in the W-League.

Players

Transfers

Transfers in

Transfers out

Competitions

W-League

League table

Results summary

Matches

Statistics

Appearances and goals
Players with no appearances not included in the list.

References

External links
 Official website

Newcastle Jets FC (A-League Women) seasons